Sliepkovce is a village and municipality in Michalovce District in the Kosice Region of eastern Slovakia.

History
In historical records the village was first mentioned in 1345.

The original village lay several kilometres to the south of its current location, closer to the neighbouring village of Budkovce. Due to marshy conditions and frequent flooding in the original location, in the 1890s, the village was reestablished at a new location several kilometres to the north (its current location) and the original village was demolished. The efforts were financed and supported by Dénes Andrássy of the Andrássy family from Krásna Hôrka. The colloquial Hungarian name of the current village of Sliepkovce is Dénesújfalu ("Dennis-new-ville"), apparently adopted in honour of Andrássy's support for the 1890s project. This newer name has also become common in the Zemplín dialect of Slovak, as Deneš.

Geography
The village lies at an altitude of 105 metres and covers an area of 6.456 km².
It has a population of 704 people.

Ethnicity
The population is about 99% Slovak in ethnicity.

Culture
The village has a small public library, and a football pitch, built in 1946.

Transport
The village has three bus stops on its main street and is serviced by regular bus lines between Michalovce and Budkovce.

The nearest railway station is 6 kilometres away at Budkovce.

Gallery

See also
 List of municipalities and towns in Michalovce District
 List of municipalities and towns in Slovakia

External links

http://www.statistics.sk/mosmis/eng/run.html

Villages and municipalities in Michalovce District
Zemplín (region)